Stefan Zachäus (born 18 October 1990) is a Luxembourgish triathlete. He qualified to represent Luxembourg at the 2020 Summer Olympics in Tokyo, competing in triathlon.

References

External links
Stefan Zachaus at triathlon.org

 

1990 births
Living people
Luxembourgian male triathletes
Triathletes at the 2020 Summer Olympics
Olympic triathletes of Luxembourg
People from Wurzen